Vamaj is a small village situated near Kadi (a town known for its oil industry) and Kalol. Its Panchayat code is 162352. It is also famous for Shri Vamaj Tirth, a temple belonging to the Jain religion. The idol of Dada Adishvar in the temple belongs to the times of king Samprati

References

Villages in Mehsana district